Ward is an unincorporated community and coal town in Kanawha County, West Virginia, United States. Its post office is closed.

Some people say the community was named after Ward Hudnall.

Earlier accounts say the community was named after David Ward. The town of Ward was built on property owned by David Ward, who resided in Michigan. The property was leased to the Kelly's Creek Colliery Company.  The Black Diamond, a coal periodical published by the National Coal Exchange in Chicago, Illinois, reported in Volume 32, Number 21, dated May 21, 1904, that the town of Ward was built by the Kelly's Creek Colliery Company in four months. Ward's son Charles Willis Ward was the Vice President of Kelly's Creek Colliery Company and the majority of the property is still owned by the estate of David Ward.

References 

Unincorporated communities in West Virginia
Unincorporated communities in Kanawha County, West Virginia
Coal towns in West Virginia